The band-tailed earthcreeper (Ochetorhynchus phoenicurus) is a species of bird in the family Furnariidae. It has traditionally been placed in the monotypic genus Eremobius, but recent evidence suggests it should be moved to Ochetorhynchus.

It is found in Patagonia. Its natural habitats are subtropical or tropical dry shrubland and temperate grassland.

References

 SACC (2007). Reinstate Ochetorhynchus and merge Chilia and Eremobius into it. Accessed 2008-10-28.

External links
Image at ADW

band-tailed earthcreeper
Birds of Patagonia
band-tailed earthcreeper
Taxonomy articles created by Polbot